18 Delphini b (abbreviated 18 Del b), formally named Arion , is an extrasolar planet approximately 249 light-years away in the constellation of Delphinus.

The 993-day period planet orbits the yellow giant star 18 Delphini.

In July 2014, the International Astronomical Union launched NameExoWorlds, a process for giving proper names to certain exoplanets and their host stars. The process involved public nomination and voting for the new names. In December 2015, the IAU announced the name Arion for this planet. The winning name was submitted by the Tokushima Prefectural Jonan High School Science Club of Japan. Arion was a genius of poetry and music in ancient Greece. According to legend, his life was saved at sea by dolphins after attracting their attention by the playing of his kithara ('Delphinus' is Latin for 'dolphin').

See also
 41 Lyncis b
 Xi Aquilae b

References

External links
  – lists data about the star.

Delphinus (constellation)
Giant planets
Exoplanets discovered in 2008
Exoplanets detected by radial velocity
Exoplanets with proper names